The Victorian Football League (VFL) is an Australian rules football competition in Australia operated by the Australian Football League (AFL) as a second-tier, regional, semi-professional competition. It includes teams from clubs based in eastern states of Australia: Victoria, New South Wales and Queensland, including reserves teams for the eastern state AFL clubs. It succeeded and continues the competition of the former Victorian Football Association (VFA) which began in 1877. The name of the competition was changed to VFL in 1996. Under its VFL brand, the AFL also operates a women's football competition known as VFL Women's, which was established in 2016.

Its predecessor, the VFA, was formed in 1877 and was the second-oldest Australian rules football league, replacing the loose affiliation of clubs that existed in the early years of the game. The VFA was the top-level club competition in Victoria until 1896 but became the secondary-level competition from 1897, after its eight strongest clubs seceded to form the VFL (now AFL). As a secondary-level competition, the VFA enjoyed peaks of popularity, in the 1940s with a faster-paced rival code of rules and in the 1970s by playing on Sundays at a time when its competitor, the VFL, played on Saturdays.

In 1995, the VFA ceased to exist as an independent organisation and control of its football competition was taken over by its former rival, the AFL which operates the competition through its subsidiary, the Victorian State Football League. AFL clubs' reserves teams first entered the competition in 2000. In 2021, the competition expanded geographically, when the AFL merged it with the North East Australian Football League to include clubs from New South Wales and Queensland. In 2022, it comprised 21 teams from the eastern states, nine of which have a continuous VFA heritage.

History

Victorian Football Association

VFA formative years (1877–1896) 

The Victorian Football Association (VFA) was founded on 17 May 1877 at the meeting of club secretaries immediately preceding the 1877 season. It was formed out of a desire to provide a formal administrative structure to the governance of the sport, and it had the power to impose binding decisions on its members on matters including the Laws of the Game, player eligibility and other disputes, as well as to facilitate intercolonial football. Decisions were made based on a vote of the Board of Management, which was composed of two delegates from each senior club, a structure which was retained until the late 1980s. It replaced a system under which the secretaries of the senior clubs met at the beginning of each year to decide on matters of mutual interest, but the system was informal and disputes often went unresolved.

The five foundation senior clubs in the Melbourne metropolitan area were Albert-park, Carlton, Hotham (later North Melbourne), Melbourne and St Kilda. Provincial clubs were also eligible for senior representation on the Association, even though most seldom played matches against the metropolitan teams; Geelong, the nearest provincial club to the metropolis, was the most prominent provincial club, joining the Association in 1877 and playing regularly against metropolitan clubs by 1880. There was no formal system of promotion and relegation between the senior and junior levels, with it largely at a club's discretion whether or not it joined the Association as a paying senior member. The affiliation fee for senior clubs was initially set at one guinea.

Through the first decade of the VFA's existence, the structure of the football season did not change significantly from the informal system which had evolved over previous years. Setting of fixtures was the responsibility of club secretaries rather than the Association itself, and in a typical season, a club could play against other VFA teams, non-VFA clubs, at odds against junior teams (usually twenty players against twenty-three), and in some seasons against intercolonial teams; although as the number of senior clubs increased, the number of matches against non-VFA clubs declined. Prior to the 1888 season, there was no formally endorsed system for awarding a VFA premiership: as had been the case since the early 1870s, the premier club was determined by public and press consensus, which by the mid-1880s was conventionally but informally understood to be the senior club which suffered the fewest losses during the season. Premierships won under this then-informal method are now considered official, and consensus was typically uncontroversial.

In 1888, the VFA first took responsibility for the onfield competition, and introduced its first formal premiership system by adopting a system of premiership points; it also awarded for the first time a premiership cap in the Association's colours to players of the premier team. The Association's influence over the on-field competition grew, and from 1894, the Association assumed responsibility for centrally setting the fixtures and standardising the number of games played by each team.

Three Ballarat-based clubs – Ballarat, Ballarat Imperial and South Ballarat – were also voting members of the VFA through this time, but were not involved in the onfield premiership.

Split (1897–1937) 

During the 1890s, there was an off-field power struggle within the VFA between the stronger and weaker clubs, as the stronger clubs sought greater administrative control commensurate with their relative financial contribution to the game. The remaining VFA clubs – Footscray, North Melbourne, Port Melbourne, Richmond and Williamstown – were given the opportunity to compete as a junior competition under and without representation on the VFL's administration, but rejected the offer and continued as an independent body. The two new competitions competed in parallel from their respective 1897 seasons.

The VFA rebuilt to ten clubs over its first independent decade, mostly by adding leading junior clubs to its ranks such as Brunswick, Prahran, West Melbourne, Essendon Town/Association, Preston, Brighton, Northcote and Hawthorn. Because the VFA was independent from the VFL (and, upon its establishment in 1906, the Australasian Football Council), the VFA had the power to set its own rules. The VFA reduced the number of on-field players from twenty to eighteen in 1897, a move followed by the VFL two years later. The VFA tried reducing the number of players further to 17 in 1908, then to 16 in 1912, before reverting to the national standard 18 in 1919. The VFA went into recess during World War I, with the 1916 and 1917 seasons cancelled and the 1915 and 1918 seasons shortened.

Over the first thirty years of the VFA's independence, its relationship with the VFL was, in general, mutually antagonistic. At different times (1913–1918 and 1923–1925), the two competitions had permit reciprocity agreements in place to prevent one competition from poaching players from the other without a clearance, but these were sporadic and remained in place only when convenient to both competitions. Attempting to defect was seen as treacherous within the VFA, and clubs which attempted to defect but failed were sometimes expelled from the VFA by the remaining clubs:  was expelled from the VFA twice (in 1908 and 1921, before reforming and rejoining on both occasions), and West Melbourne was expelled permanently in 1908.

The loss of the VFA's strongest three clubs to the VFL in 1925 firmly cemented the VFA as the second-tier competition in the state. Between 1925 and 1929, the addition of outer suburban clubs in Coburg (1925), Camberwell (1926), a new club from Preston (1926), Yarraville (1928), Oakleigh (1929) and Sandringham (1929) expanded the VFA back to twelve teams. The relationship with the VFL improved, and a new permit reciprocity agreement was established in 1931.

Throw-pass era (1938–1949) 

In 1938, the VFA made a bold rule change by legalising throwing of the football in general play, provided the throw was underarm with both hands below shoulder height. The change helped to speed up the game, and introduced more run-and-carry play in an era which had previously been dominated by a long-kicking style, proving popular with many spectators. Additionally, the VFA ended its permit agreement with the VFL, and began to aggressively recruit star players by offering salaries well in excess of the maximum set by VFL player payment laws. This included Laurie Nash, Bob Pratt and Ron Todd, who were in the primes of their careers and were considered amongst the best players in the country. These changes gave the VFA a product which could compete with the VFL for public interest, and it made the late 1930s and 1940s one of the most successful periods in the VFA's history. The VFA competition went into recess from 1942 until 1944 due to World War II, but continued to perform strongly upon returning in 1945. The VFA was incorporated in 1946.

While the throw-pass was in effect, particularly during the early 1940s, there were talks between the VFA and VFL towards re-amalgamating the two bodies. Although the throw-pass had been a great success for the VFA, it was felt that a single controlling body for football in Victoria playing under a uniform set of rules was in the best interests of football as a whole. Negotiations for an amalgamation took place over several years, but broke down several times over a variety of issues, including representation at board level, Australian National Football Council representation, and a promotion and relegation structure between the VFA and VFL.

In the end, the two bodies never amalgamated, but the schism ended in 1949 when the bodies re-established a permit reciprocity agreement and the VFA was granted a non-voting position on the Australian National Football Council, later upgraded to a voting position in 1953; as a condition of joining, it was forced to abandon the throw-pass rule and adopt the national standard rules. These changes benefitted Victorian football as a whole, gave the VFA a say in national administration of the game. It also gave the VFA the right to compete in interstate matches, and at interstate carnivals over the 1950s and 1960s, the VFA generally competed at a similar standard to Tasmania as the fourth- or fifth-best team in the competition.

However, joining the ANFC also stripped the VFA of the throw-pass, and therefore of the on-field distinctions which allowed it to compete with the VFL for fans; this, coupled with the increased mobility of suburban Melburnians – who, due to the increased affordability of cars and the lifting in 1950 of wartime travel restrictions, were no longer captive audiences for their local VFA teams – resulted in a significant downturn in most VFA clubs during the 1950s. On-field, the competition became dominated by the few clubs with strong community links such as Port Melbourne, Williamstown, Sandringham, Oakleigh and Moorabbin (who had joined the VFA alongside Box Hill in 1951); the gap between those clubs and the weaker clubs, many of whom were periodically forced to play as amateurs due to a lack of money, grew large and the popularity of the competition declined.

Gillon era (1954–1980) 
Alex Gillon presided over the VFA from 1954 until 1980. During that time, the VFA underwent a series of changes to reinvigorate it after its post-throw pass decline of the 1950s. Major strategic changes were undertaken, including:
As Melbourne expanded geographically, the VFA embarked on a deliberate plan to establish its presence in new areas by expanding the number of teams into the newer, outer suburbs. Between 1958 and 1966, new clubs were added in Dandenong, Geelong West, Mordialloc, Sunshine, Frankston, Waverley and Werribee.
In 1961, when the eighteenth club joined, the VFA was split into First and Second Divisions, the First Division having 10 teams, and Second Division holding the balance, with one team promoted and one team relegated between the two divisions each season. This plan was aimed at improving overall competitiveness of the competition and overcoming the huge gap between the strongest and weakest clubs which had led to unentertaining football in the late 1950s.
In 1959, the VFA again reduced the size of the on-field team to sixteen, eliminating the two wing positions, to result in a more open field than under league rules. The VFA played 16-a-side from 1959 until 1992.
In 1960, the VFA first began playing premiership matches on Sundays. This allowed VFA matches to be played without competing the VFL for spectators, and within a few years, clubs found that Sunday matches were as much as three to four times more lucrative than Saturday games. By the 1970s, all games were played on a Sunday, while the VFL played its games on Saturdays. This was similar to the College/Pro football day divide still present in the US. The Victorian Government supported the VFA's new-found vigour, and rejected requests by the VFL to hold its own games on Sundays until the mid-1980s.
Finally, the VFA's importance grew significantly after signing a television broadcast deal with ATV0 (later Network Ten), which saw a weekly live broadcast (in colour, when the technology became available) of one game from 1967 until 1981, at a time when VFL matches were shown only as partial replays.

All of these changes resulted in the VFA enjoying a successful period during the 1970s. Increased sponsorship, public awareness, and a greater number of former and fringe VFL players joining the VFA gave it a product which allowed it to flourish in the Sunday timeslot. The VFA at this time comprised twenty clubs, ten in each division, with a constant membership between 1966 and 1981. Attendances at matches more than doubled between 1967 and 1975.

The VFA's relationship with the VFL and ANFC again deteriorated during the 1960s. In 1965, the VFA stopped recognising its permit reciprocity agreement in retribution for two takeovers of VFA club grounds by VFL clubs (St Kilda at Moorabbin and North Melbourne at Coburg); then in 1967, the VFL stopped recognising the agreement in retribution for the VFA's the introduction of excessive transfer fees on its players. After the VFA refused to comply with an ANFC demand that a new reciprocal permit agreement be established, the VFA was expelled from the ANFC in 1970.

Decline (1981–1994) 
The decline of the VFA is often said to have commenced in 1982 when the VFL's struggling South Melbourne Swans moved to Sydney, as all Sydney Swans home games were played on Sunday and televised, ending the VFA's monopoly on Sunday football; Network Ten ended its weekly VFA coverage in the same year. However, this was not the sole cause for decline, which had started in the late 1970s: changing demographics meant that many traditional clubs had slowly found themselves in areas with high migrant populations, which either made it difficult to compete with soccer for local for fans and players, or simply brought a level of cultural apathy towards the sport in general; VFA historian Marc Fiddian also noted a decline in the number of ex-VFL players signing with VFA clubs through the late 1970s, which reduced the Association's drawing power, and an increasing gulf in quality between the best and worst clubs. Player payments increased through the 1980s, and declining financial support and sponsorship meant that many clubs began to struggle badly. The VFA had also developed a reputation for rough play and violence, and it was not until the late 1980s that it was able to clean up on-field discipline and shake that image.

In 1981, new VFA president Alan Wickes attempted to rectify the decline with further expansion: the VFA expanded further into the outer suburbs to twenty-four teams in 1983, adding Springvale, Moorabbin, Kilsyth and Berwick, and Wickes had a vision of expanding to thirty teams with an additional lower division which could affiliate more directly with the top tiers of suburban football; but (with the exception of Springvale), the new second division teams did little to reinvigorate the competition, and the clubs rejected any further expansion.

The VFA's direction changed dramatically with the election of Brook Andersen as president in 1985. At the time, the VFL was looking at national expansion (ultimately becoming the Australian Football League in 1990) and Andersen's executive committee believed that the VFA could fill a new role as top state level league in Victoria when this happened; however, it believed that the VFA would need to be rationalised to a competition of twelve financially stable teams for this to occur. Andersen attempted but failed to obtain a mandate from the clubs to impose this rationalisation, but the VFA under his guidance nevertheless contracted, as it showed no lenience in suspending clubs who failed to meet minimum requirements. Several long-term second division clubs, struggling with rising costs and foreseeing the dissolution of the second division (which ultimately occurred when fifteen teams remained in the 1989 season), also took the opportunity to return to suburban football before being forced out. The eight-year period between 1984 and 1991 saw twelve clubs exit the VFA: Mordialloc, Kilsyth, Berwick, Geelong West and Camberwell returned to suburban football; Yarraville, Moorabbin, Northcote and Caulfield were suspended; and Sunshine, Brunswick-Broadmeadows and Waverley all folded.

The VFA rejoined the ANFC as a non-voting member in 1987, and replaced the board of club delegates with an independent executive committee in 1988. It also regained weekly television coverage from the 1988 season onwards, with the ABC broadcasting a match each Saturday. It returned to the standard 18-per-side rules in 1993.

End of the VFA (1994–1999) 
Despite the rationalisation to its twelve strongest teams and improved television coverage, the financial position of the competition and the vast majority of its clubs remained perilous into the early 1990s, and it was clear that the VFA was no longer a viable independent body in the long term. At the end of the 1994 season, the VFA was formally disbanded in an administrative capacity, and the on-field competition was turned over to the AFL's Victorian State Football League which the AFL had set up two years earlier to take control of Australian football at all levels in Victoria and which ran the statewide under-18s competition (the present day NAB League) and the AFL reserves competition in Victoria. This ended the VFA's 97 years of independence from the VFL/AFL and, for the first time since 1896, created a single control for most Australian football in Victoria. Victorian Football Association Limited was deregistered in 2012.

AFL control

New VFL competition 
The VSFL retained the use of the VFA name for the competition for the 1995 season but, in 1996, renamed the competition Victorian Football League (VFL), the AFL's former name until 1990.The VSFL sought to align the competition with the under-18s competition, with each former VFA club affiliated with an under-18s team to provide a developmental pathway from under-18 football into state-level senior football. In doing this, the number of metropolitan teams was cut from twelve to nine in 1995, with Prahran, Oakleigh and Dandenong departing. This left nine clubs with a VFA heritage, coming from different eras: Port Melbourne and Williamstown from the pre-1897 era; Preston, Coburg and Sandringham from the 1920s expansion; Box Hill, Werribee and Frankston from the 1950s/1960s expansion; and Springvale from the 1980s expansion.

The VSFL intended that each statewide under-18s team would be affiliated with a VFL club, so embarked upon a period of expansion to represent the four under-18s teams from country Victoria, as well as Tasmania (which was represented in the competition for a period of time). In this expansion, existing powerhouse country clubs North Ballarat and Traralgon joined the league in 1996, with new clubs established in Bendigo, Albury (the Murray Kangaroos, representing the Ovens & Murray region) and Tasmania between 1998 and 2001. The regional senior clubs struggled to be financially viable in the statewide competition, with Traralgon and Murray lasting only two and three years respectively. Since 2018, no regional clubs have contested the competition.

Merger with the AFL reserves (2000–2019) 

From 1995 until 1999, the VSFL operated its two open-age competitions – the VFA/VFL and the Victorian AFL reserves competition – separately; however, its intention had always been to merge the two, and this took place following the 1999 season, after the agreement of the AFL clubs. Under the administration's new name Football Victoria (later AFL Victoria), those two competitions were merged into a single competition still known as the Victorian Football League. Since this time, the VFL has been contested by a mixture of three types of clubs:
VFL clubs, operating on a stand-alone basis and maintaining a complete list of players
The reserves teams of AFL clubs, comprised on AFL reserves players and a small list of supplementary players to make up a full team
VFL clubs operating under an affiliation arrangements with an AFL clubs, whereby players from the AFL club would join the senior team of the VFL club when not selected to play in the AFL. At times, there were rules limiting the number of AFL-listed players who could play in a VFL team, but these rules no longer exist.
All three models compete to a relatively even standard, with premierships having been won by all three types of team since the merger. An additional reserves affiliation option, under which AFL clubs were allowed to spread their reserves players across all of the league's VFL clubs rather than into a single aligned club, has also existed since 2021 but has not been taken up by any AFL clubs.

The affiliation deals greatly improved the financial viability of the clubs in question, but they diluted their ability to represent their suburb. There have been many changes to the affiliation arrangements in the decade since the VSFL took over the VFA competition, as well as a shift in the arrangement preferred by the AFL clubs. Initially, only four of the ten Victorian AFL clubs were involved in a VFL affiliation, with the rest fielding reserves teams. At its peak of between 2003 and 2006, nine of the ten Victorian AFL clubs were involved in an affiliation, with only Geelong fielding its own reserves team. Most clubs have since migrated away from this model, and since 2021 seven of the ten Victorian AFL clubs have fielded stand-alone reserves teams in the VFL. Through the 2000s, the AFL preferred that its Victorian clubs retained VFL-affiliations, and offered a disincentive in the form of an inflated licence fee for fielding a stand-alone team; however, the AFL did not otherwise prevent teams from fielding stand-alone reserves teams if they were willing and able to pay the fee. The total licence and running costs for an AFL club to field its reserves team in the VFL were estimated to be $500,000 per year in 2011.

Through this period, the VFL remained moderately popular in Victoria, although not nearly as well-supported as the dominant Australian Football League. Matches attracted both traditional fans of the VFA/VFL clubs, and fans of affiliated AFL clubs keen to watch their reserves players in action. The match of the week and most finals continued to be televised live in Melbourne by the ABC until 2014, and since 2015 by the Seven Network as a lead-in to its AFL coverage.

Northeast expansion (2020–present) 
The 2020 VFL season was cancelled as a result of the COVID-19 pandemic. Upon the VFL's resumption in 2021, the North East Australian Football League – which had served as the state league in New South Wales, Queensland and the Australian Capital Territory – was wound up and absorbed into the VFL; this resulted in the reserves teams from the New South Wales and Queensland AFL clubs (Sydney, Greater Western Sydney, Brisbane and Gold Coast) joining the league, and two of the NEAFL's other Queensland-based senior clubs – Aspley and Southport – joining, although Aspley departed after the 2021 season. This brought the league to its largest size since the 1980s, with 22 clubs competing: eight stand-alone VFL clubs, eleven AFL reserves teams, and three traditional VFA/VFL clubs in reserves affiliations with AFL clubs. The league was also revamped to improve its ability to serve as a talent pathway, with each club required to field at least six under-22 players in each game. The 2021 season also saw increased broadcast coverage with Foxtel and its streaming service Kayo showing games in addition to the ongoing deal with Seven Network.

Awards

Best and fairest

The first award for the Association best and fairest player was the Woodham Cup, first awarded in 1923; this was renamed the Recorder Cup in 1926. Starting from 1933, a second award, the V.F.A. Medal, was awarded concurrently; the awards were both based on the votes of the umpires, but were based on different voting systems. In 1940, the Association dispensed with the Recorder Cup voting system, and awarded both trophies to the same player based on the same set of votes.

Since 1945, the award for the best and fairest player in each VFA/VFL season has been the J. J. Liston Trophy, named after long-term Association president John James Liston, who died in 1944.

Other awards
 The Jim 'Frosty' Miller Medal is awarded annually to the leading goal-kicker in the VFL home-and-away season; it was struck in 1999 and named after Jim 'Frosty' Miller, who kicked 885 goals for Dandenong between 1966 and 1974.
 The Norm Goss Memorial Medal, awarded annually to the player voted best afield in the VFL grand final; it was struck in 1983 in honour of Norm Goss, Sr., a senior administrator in both the VFA and the Port Melbourne Football Club.
 The Fothergill–Round–Mitchell Medal, awarded annually to the most promising young talent in the VFL competition; it was struck in 1989 and is named after the three players who have won a Brownlow Medals in the VFL/AFL and won a Recorder Cup/Liston Trophy in the VFL: Des Fothergill and Barry Round, after whom the award was originally named, and Sam Mitchell, whose name was added to the award in 2018.
 The Frank Johnson Medal, awarded to the player voted best afield for the VFL in interstate football games; named after Frank Johnson, the only VFA player ever selected as captain of an All-Australian Team.

Salary cap 
The VFL is classed as a semi-professional competition. In 2007 the league had a salary cap of $185,000, excluding service payments. There are a significantly higher number of AFL reserves due to affiliations with Victorian clubs, but player payments for these appearances is apparently not included in the VFL's salary cap. Following the 2013 VFL season, it was revealed that several clubs were lobbying VFL executives to increase the salary cap in a bid to keep high-level players who had relieved themselves of participating in the league to accept more attractive financial offers in local football competitions, where such caps are far less regulated.

As of the 2022 season, standalone clubs in the league, of which there are eight, have a A$220,000 salary cap, while the AFL reserve and affiliate clubs have a A$110,000 salary cap.

Attendance 
Attendances are small by AFL standards, and generally less than the SANFL and WAFL, with an average of between 500 and 1,000 in attendance. Crowds for many finals matches tend to average in the 2,000–6,000 range, with the Grand Final typically attracting a crowd in the 10,000–14,000 mark.

The VFL does not publish home-and-away attendance figures, as some games are played as AFL curtain raisers; however, various sources quote attendances for some games of the stronger clubs that maintain home records of their own.

Premierships

Recent Grand Finals

Media coverage

Television 
Television coverage has been critical to the exposure of the VFA/VFL during its history, and has typically taken the form of the match of the week being televised live into Melbourne, as well as most finals. Television and streaming deals during the league's history are as follows:
1967–1981: weekly broadcasts of Sunday's match of the round on ATV0 (later Network Ten)
1984–1986: match of the round in the final two rounds, plus finals on Network Ten
1987: finals only on ABC Victoria
1988–2014: weekly broadcasts of match of the round on Saturday afternoons, plus most or all finals, on ABC Victoria.
2000: in addition to ABC's coverage, one Monday night match televised each week on the Seven Network's C7 Sport subscription channel. At this time, pay TV penetration was low, and this lasted only one year.
2015–2019: weekly broadcasts of match of the round on Saturday afternoons, plus most finals, on Seven Network
2021: up to three matches per round available on sports streaming service Kayo Sports, one Sunday "match of the round" game broadcast on Seven, and one Thursday night game broadcast on Fox Footy (only when no AFL Thursday night fixture is scheduled).
2022–present: one match per round broadcast live on Seven Network and available live and on-demand nationally on 7plus streaming site, and all additional matches live streamed and available on demand on the AFL website and AFL Live app.

The VFA holds the distinction of having the first match to be broadcast live on television in Australia, when the second half of the match between Oakleigh and Preston on 25 May 1957 was televised on Channel 2.

Radio 
The first regular radio broadcasts of VFA games were made by 3XY, a little after the station commenced operations in 1935. The commentator was former Geelong VFL player Wallace "Jumbo" Sharland who had earlier been the first to describe VFL matches, that being on 3AR in 1923. In 1954 3AK began broadcasting VFA games, albeit only for a season or two. The 1970s also saw broadcasts on 3UZ, and local Geelong station, 3GL, broadcast all Geelong West matches. In 1982, the then-dominant Melbourne sports radio station, 3AW, broadcast the Grand Final. In 2003, 3AK evolved into sports radio station SEN 1116, and provided a coverage of VFL matches, but this was discontinued after they won the rights to broadcast the AFL (Australian Football League) from the 2007 season. From 1993 onwards radio's main home for the competition was on Casey Radio where the team, headed up by Ken Moore, did a terrific job bringing games to the wider public. The station gave a start to such broadcasters as Nigel Carmody, Darren Parkin and Tristan Foenander and has proven a terrific breeding ground for emerging sports broadcasters. The station still broadcasts the league today, combined with doing the local league down in Melbourne's southeast.

VFL Radio is produced by BPM Media who broadcast live at least one game a week during the regular season plus each day of the finals series. The coverage is broadcast on the Vision Australia Radio network throughout Victoria on analogue radio, by Aussie digital radio (SEN 2) and on the internet at vfl.com.au or bpmmedia.com.au.

Clubs

Current clubs 
Twenty-one clubs formed the VFL in the 2022 season.

 AFLR - Australian Football League Reserves
 ESFL - Eastern Suburbs Football League
 FFL - Fderal Football League
 MDA - Melbourne District Association
 MPFL - Mornington Peninsula Football League
 NEAFL - North East Australian Football League
 VJFA - Victorian Junior Football Association

Former clubs 
The VFA and VFL have undergone significant format changes since its induction which means several clubs have either left the league or changed identity for different reasons. Excluded from this list are provincial clubs who were full administrative members of the VFA in its first decade, but who never played enough games against other clubs to be considered relevant in the premiership.

 (S) - Senior team now in the AFL

Timeline

Map

VFA presidents
The following men served as president of the VFA between its establishment in 1877 and its becoming defunct in 1994.

VFL Women's

From the 2016 season, a statewide women's football league aligned with the VFL was established by AFL Victoria. The competition initially comprised the six Premier Division clubs and the top four Division 1 clubs from the now-defunct Victorian Women's Football League (VWFL), and was aligned and co-branded with the VFL to improve market penetration. Following the 2017 season, the competition was reconfigured to affiliate teams more closely with AFL clubs. Since 2018, the league has comprised thirteen teams; twelve are based in Victoria (nine of which are affiliated with AFL clubs) and one in the Northern Territory. The league runs from May to September, running concurrently with the VFL.

Former grades

Seconds/reserves
The VFA/VFL operated a seconds or reserves competition from the 1920s, initially emerging from the Victorian Junior Football Association. From its inception until 1979, the seconds team played on Saturday afternoons, playing at home when the senior team played away and vice versa. Since 1980, seconds matches have been played as curtain-raisers to senior matches, on Saturdays or Sundays as necessary. The competition was later renamed the reserves, and then from the beginning of the 2012 season it has been known as the AFL Victoria Development League, a move that coincided with the introduction of the AFL Victoria Development Academy which provides development opportunities for up to 25 selected VFL players per year. For most of the VFA's history, fielding a team in the seconds grade was mandatory for all senior teams, but in the state league era many regional clubs – as well as all AFL clubs fielding their reserves teams in the VFL seniors – opted not to contest the minor grade. The Development League was abolished after the 2017 season with all VFL clubs' reserve players now play suburban football when not playing with the VFL seniors. (List of VFL Seconds Premiers)

Thirds/Under-19s
The VFA operated an under-19s competition, initially known as the Thirds, between 1952 and 1994. The Under-19s was disbanded when the AFL's VSFL took over the VFA competition after the 1994, with the statewide under-19s competition (the present day NAB League) replacing its function as an under-18s competition. (List of VFA Thirds Premiers)

Records

Highest Scores

Largest Winning Margins

See also 
 List of VFA/VFL premiers
 History of Australian rules football in Victoria (1859–1900)

References

External links 
 
 List of VFA/VFL premiers since 1877
 VFA and VFL statistics and history at Full Points Footy
 VFL Mark of the Year competition

 
History of Australian rules football
1
1877 establishments in Australia
Sports competitions in Melbourne
Sports leagues established in 1877
Professional sports leagues in Australia